Ng, ng, or NG  may refer to:
 Ng (name) (黄 伍 吳), a surname of Chinese origin

Arts and entertainment
 N-Gage (disambiguation), a handheld gaming system
 Naked Giants, Seattle rock band
 Spirit Hunter: NG, a video game

Businesses and organizations 
 Lauda Air (airline code NG)
 National Geographic (disambiguation)
 National Grid plc, a British multinational electricity and gas utility company
 National Guard (disambiguation)
 Nederlandse Gidsen (Dutch Guides), one of the Scouting organisations that evolved into the national Scouting organisation of the Netherlands
 Newgrounds, an American entertainment and social media website and company
 Northrop Grumman Corporation, a major United States defense contractor
 Notgemeinschaft der Deutschen Wissenschaft, a German scientific society

Language 
 Ndonga dialect (ISO 639 alpha-2 ng), a dialect of Oshiwambo
 Ng (digraph), a pair of letters representing various sounds
 Ng (Arabic letter)
 Ng (Filipino letter)
 Eng (letter) (Ŋ ŋ)
 Cyrillic characters:
 En with descender (Cyrillic) (Ң  ң)
 En with hook (Ӈ ӈ)
 En-ghe (Cyrillic) (Ҥ ҥ)
 En with middle hook (Ԣ ԣ)
 Voiced velar nasal, /ŋ/ in International Phonetic Alphabet
 Emoji character  (Unicode U+1F196) used in Japan for "no good" (originally referring to bloopers shown during or after Japanese live TV shows)

Places
 Nigeria (ISO country code NG)
 .ng the Internet country code top-level domain (ccTLD) for Nigeria
 Niger (FIPS country code NG)
 NG postcode area, that covers most of Nottinghamshire, England

Science and technology 
 Nitroglycerin
 Nanogram (ng)
 Natural gas
 Nasogastric (NG), pertaining both to the nose and to the stomach (e.g. see nasogastric intubation)
 Noble gas (placeholder symbol Ng)

Other uses 
 Software (-package) suffixed with -ng, (as next generation) to distinguish between newer or expanded implementations (e.g. Util-linux-ng or Syslog-ng)
 Angular, a leading web application framework
 A blooper (a no good cut) in East Asian variants of English
 A no good (forbidden) word in the "NG word game"
 The Nederduits Gereformeerde Kerk (Low-German Reformed Church), a church in South Africa

See also 
 
 Next Generation (disambiguation)
 No Good (disambiguation)